Toechima livescens is a species of plant in the lychee family that is native to New Guinea. It has been recorded from the vicinity of Sogeri in the Central Province of Papua New Guinea.

References

livescens
Flora of New Guinea
Taxa named by Ludwig Adolph Timotheus Radlkofer
Plants described in 1890